Hammond station may refer to:

Hammond station (Louisiana), an Amtrak station in Hammond, Louisiana
Hammond station (South Shore Line), a train station in Hammond, Indiana
Hammond–Whiting station, an Amtrak station in Hammond, Indiana

See also
Hammond (disambiguation)